Ganguvada is a village under Pathapatnam mandal in Srikakulam district, Andhra Pradesh.

Ganguvada station is located on Naupada-Gunupur railway.
It is 8 km from Pathapatnam.

Demographics
According to Indian census, 2001, the demographic details of this village is as follows:
 Total Population: 	2,065 in 498 Households.
 Male Population: 	1,015
 Female Population: 	1,050
 Children Under 6-years: 	321 (Boys - 155 and Girls - 166)
 Total Literates: 	832

References

Villages in Srikakulam district